Scalia is an Italian surname. Notable people with the surname include:

Antonin Scalia (1936–2016), American judge
Daniela Scalia (born 1975), Italian television journalist and presenter
Eugene Scalia (born 1963), U.S. Secretary of Labor, son of Antonin Scalia
Jack Scalia (born 1950), American actor
Jimmy Scalia (born 1960), American record producer
Liz Scalia, British-Italian cyclist
Pietro Scalia (born 1960), Italian-American film editor
Silvia Scalia (born 1995), Italian swimmer
Vito Scalia (1925–2009), Italian politician

Italian-language surnames